The Republic of Croatia is a sovereign country at the crossroads of Central Europe, Southeast Europe, and the Mediterranean that declared its independence from Yugoslavia on 25 June 1991. Croatia is a member of the European Union (EU), United Nations (UN), the Council of Europe, NATO, the World Trade Organization (WTO), Union for the Mediterranean and a number of other international organizations. Croatia has established diplomatic relations with 187 countries. The president and the Government, through the Ministry of Foreign and European Affairs, co-operate in the formulation and implementation of foreign policy.

The main objectives of Croatian foreign policy during the 1990s were gaining international recognition and joining the United Nations. These objectives were achieved by 2000, and the main goals became NATO and EU membership. Croatia fulfilled these goals in 2009 and 2013 respectively. Current Croatian goals in foreign policy are: positioning within the EU institutions and in the region, cooperation with NATO partners and strengthening multilateral and bilateral cooperation worldwide.

History

Croatian foreign policy has focused on greater Euro-Atlantic integration, mainly entering the European Union and NATO. In order to gain access to European and trans-Atlantic institutions, it has had to undo many negative effects of the breakup of Yugoslavia and the war that ensued, and improve and maintain good relations with its neighbors.

Key issues over the last decade have been the implementation of the Dayton Accords and the Erdut Agreement, nondiscriminatory facilitation of the return of refugees and displaced persons from the 1991–95 war including property restitution for ethnic Serbs, resolution of border disputes with Slovenia, Bosnia and Herzegovina, Serbia and Montenegro, and general democratization.

Croatia has had an uneven record in these areas between 1996 and 1999 during the right-wing HDZ government, inhibiting its relations with the European Union and the United States. Improvement in these areas severely hindered the advance of Croatia's prospects for further Euro-Atlantic integration. Progress in the areas of Dayton, Erdut, and refugee returns were evident in 1998, but progress was slow and required intensive international engagement.

Croatia's unsatisfactory performance implementing broader democratic reforms in 1998 raised questions about the ruling party's commitment to basic democratic principles and norms. Areas of concern included restrictions on freedom of speech, one-party control of public TV and radio, repression of independent media, unfair electoral regulations, a judiciary that is not fully independent, and lack of human and civil rights protection.

A centre-left coalition government was elected in early 2000. The SDP-led government slowly relinquished control over public media companies and did not interfere with freedom of speech and independent media, though it did not complete the process of making Croatian Radiotelevision independent. Judiciary reforms remained a pending issue as well.

Major Croatian advances in foreign relations during this period have included:
 admittance into NATO's Partnership for Peace Programme in May 2000
 admittance into World Trade Organization in July 2000;
 signing a Stabilization and Association Agreement with the EU in October 2001
 becoming part of NATO's Membership Action Plan in May 2002
 becoming a member of the Central European Free Trade Agreement (CEFTA) in December 2002
 application for membership in the EU in February 2003
 full cooperation with the Hague Tribunal and the beginning of accession negotiations with the EU in October 2005
 Croatia formally designated as the 40th member of the Visa Waiver Program (VWP). The Electronic System for Travel Authorization (ESTA) system is now available for Croatia.

The EU application was the last major international undertaking of the Račan government, which submitted a 7,000-page report in reply to the questionnaire by the European Commission.

Foreign relations were severely affected by the government's hesitance and stalling of the extradition of Croatian general Janko Bobetko to the International Criminal Tribunal for the Former Yugoslavia (ICTY), and inability to take general Ante Gotovina into custody for questioning by the Court.

Refugee returns accelerated since 1999, reached a peak in 2000, but then slightly decreased in 2001 and 2002. The OSCE mission in Croatia has continued to monitor the return of refugees and is still recording civil rights violations. Croatian Serbs continue to have problems with restitution of property and acceptance to the reconstruction assistance programmes. Combined with lacking economic opportunities in the rural areas of former Krajina, the return process is highly troubled.

Accession to the European Union

At the time of Croatia's application to the European Union, three EU members states were yet to ratify the Stabilization and Association Agreement: United Kingdom, the Netherlands and Italy. The new Sanader government elected in 2003 elections repeated the assurances that Croatia will fulfill the missing political obligations, and expedited the extradition of several ICTY inductees. The European Commission replied to the answers of the questionnaire sent to Croatia on 20 April 2004 with a positive opinion. The country was finally accepted as EU candidate in July 2004. Italy and United Kingdom ratified the Stabilization and Association Agreement shortly thereafter, while the ten EU member states that were admitted to membership that year ratified it all together at a 2004 European Summit. In December 2004, the EU leaders announced that accession negotiations with Croatia would start on 17 March 2005 provided that Croatian government cooperates fully with the ICTY. The main issue, the flight of general Gotovina, however, remained unsolved and despite the agreement on an accession negotiation framework, the negotiations did not begin in March 2005. On 4 October 2005 Croatia finally received green light for accession negotiations after the Chief Prosecutor of the ICTY Carla Del Ponte officially stated that Croatia is fully cooperating with the Tribunal. This has been the main condition demanded by EU foreign ministers for accession negotiations. The ICTY called upon other southern European states to follow Croatia's good example. Thanks to the consistent position of Austria during the meeting of EU foreign ministers, a long period of instability and the questioning of the determination of the Croatian government to extradite alleged war criminals has ended successfully. Croatian Prime minister Ivo Sanader declared that full cooperation with the Hague Tribunal will continue. The accession process was also complicated by the insistence of Slovenia, an EU member state, that the two countries' border issues be dealt with prior to Croatia's accession to the EU.

Croatia finished accession negotiations on 30 June 2011, and on 9 December 2011, signed the Treaty of Accession. A referendum on EU accession was held in Croatia on 22 January 2012, with 66% of participants voting in favour of joining the Union.  The ratification process was concluded on 21 June 2013, and entry into force and accession of Croatia to the EU took place on 1 July 2013.

Current events
The main objective of the Croatian foreign policy is positioning within the EU institutions and in the region, cooperation with NATO partners and strengthening multilateral and bilateral cooperation.

Government officials in charge of foreign policy include the Minister of Foreign and European Affairs, currently Gordan Grlić-Radman, and the President of the Republic, currently Zoran Milanović.

Croatia has established diplomatic relations with 186 countries (see List of diplomatic relations of Croatia). As of 2009, Croatia maintains a network of 51 embassies, 24 consulates and eight permanent diplomatic missions abroad. Furthermore, there are 52 foreign embassies and 69 consulates in the Republic of Croatia in addition to offices of international organizations such as the European Bank for Reconstruction and Development, International Organization for Migration, Organization for Security and Co-operation in Europe (OSCE), World Bank, World Health Organization, International Criminal Tribunal for the former Yugoslavia (ICTY), United Nations Development Programme, United Nations High Commissioner for Refugees and UNICEF.

International organizations
Republic of Croatia participates in the following international organizations:
CE,
CEI,
EAPC,
EBRD,
ECE,
EU,
FAO,
G11,
IADB,
IAEA,
IBRD,
ICAO,
ICC,
ICRM,
IDA,
IFAD,
IFC,
IFRCS,
IHO,
ILO,
IMF,
IMO,
Inmarsat,
Intelsat,
Interpol,
IOC,
IOM,
ISO,
ITU,
ITUC,
NAM (observer),
NATO,
OAS (observer),
OPCW,
OSCE,
PCA,
PFP,
SECI,
UN,
UNAMSIL,
UNCTAD,
UNESCO,
UNIDO,
UNMEE,
UNMOGIP,
UPU,
WCO,
WEU (associate),
WHO,
WIPO,
WMO,
WToO,
WTO

There exists a Permanent Representative of Croatia to the United Nations.

Foreign support
Croatia receives support from donor programs of:
 European Bank for Reconstruction and Development (EBRD)
 European Union
 International Bank for Reconstruction and Development
 International Monetary Fund
 USAID

Between 1991 and 2003, the EBRD had directly invested a total of 1,212,039,000 EUR into projects in Croatia.

In 1998, U.S. support to Croatia came through the Southeastern European Economic Development Program (SEED), whose funding in Croatia totaled $23.25 million. More than half of that money was used to fund programs encouraging sustainable returns of refugees and displaced persons. About one-third of the assistance was used for democratization efforts, and another 5% funded financial sector restructuring.

In 2003 USAID considered Croatia to be on a "glide path for graduation" along with Bulgaria. Its 2002/2003/2004 funding includes around $10 million for economic development, up to $5 million for the development of democratic institutions, about $5 million for the return of population affected by war and between 2 and 3 million dollars for the "mitigation of adverse social conditions and trends". A rising amount of funding is given to cross-cutting programs in anti-corruption, slightly under one million dollars.

The European Commission has proposed to assist Croatia's efforts to join the European Union with 245 million euros from PHARE, ISPA and SAPARD aid programs over the course of 2005 and 2006.

International disputes
Relations with neighbouring states have normalized somewhat since the breakup of Yugoslavia. Work has begun — bilaterally and within the Stability Pact for South Eastern Europe since 1999 — on political and economic cooperation in the region.

Bosnia and Herzegovina

Discussions continue between Croatia and Bosnia and Herzegovina on various sections of the border, the longest border with another country for each of these countries.

Sections of the Una river and villages at the base of Mount Plješevica are in Croatia, while some are in Bosnia, which causes an excessive number of border crossings on a single route and impedes any serious development in the region. The Zagreb-Bihać-Split railway line is still closed for major traffic due to this issue.

The border on the Una river between Hrvatska Kostajnica on the northern, Croatian side of the river, and Bosanska Kostajnica on the southern, Bosnian side, is also being discussed. A river island between the two towns is under Croatian control, but is also claimed by Bosnia. A shared border crossing point has been built and has been functioning since 2003, and is used without hindrance by either party.

The Herzegovinian municipality of Neum in the south makes the southernmost part of Croatia an exclave and the two countries are negotiating special transit rules through Neum to compensate for that. Recently Croatia has opted to build a bridge to the Pelješac peninsula to connect the Croatian mainland with the exclave but Bosnia and Herzegovina has protested that the bridge will close its access to international waters (although Croatian territory and territorial waters surround Bosnian-Herzegovinian territory and waters completely) and has suggested that the bridge must be higher than 55 meters for free passage of all types of ships. Negotiations are still being held.

Italy

The relations between Croatia and Italy have been largely cordial and friendly, although occasional incidents do arise on issues such as the Istrian–Dalmatian exodus or the Ecological and Fisheries Protection Zone.

Montenegro

Croatia and Montenegro have a largely latent border dispute over the Prevlaka peninsula.

Serbia

The Danube border between Croatia and Serbia is in dispute, particularly in Baranja, the Island of Vukovar and the Island of Šarengrad.

Slovenia

Croatia and Slovenia have several land and maritime boundary disputes, mainly in the Gulf of Piran, regarding
Slovenian access to international waters, a small number of pockets of land on the right-hand side of the river Dragonja,
and around the Sveta Gera peak.

Slovenia was disputing Croatia's claim to establish the Ecological and Fisheries Protection Zone, an economic section of the Adriatic.

Other issues that have yet to be fully resolved include:
 Croatian depositors' savings in the former Ljubljanska banka

Diplomatic relations 

Countries which Croatia maintains diplomatic relations with:

Bilateral relations

Multilateral

Africa

Americas

Asia

Europe

Oceania

See also
 Croatian passport
 List of diplomatic missions in Croatia
 List of diplomatic missions of Croatia
 Visa requirements for Croatian citizens
 List of diplomatic relations of Croatia
 Foreign relations of Yugoslavia

References

External links
 Ministry of Foreign Affairs and European Integration
 Government of the Republic of Croatia
 EBRD and Croatia
 Stability Pact for South Eastern Europe